Revengers Football Club also known as Revengers FC is a Seychellois football club based in Praslin, Seychelles. The club competes in Seychelles' premier league, the Seychelles First Division.

Stadium
The club plays its home matches at Stade d’Amitié, a 2,000-capacity stadium located in Praslin.

References

Football clubs in Seychelles